Gideon 'Gidi' Damti (born 31 October 1951) is an Israeli football manager and former player. He is currently manager of Sektzia Nes Tziona. He has also been manager at Maccabi Netanya.

See also
List of one-club men

References

External links
Jews in Sports profile

1951 births
Living people
Israeli Jews
Israeli footballers
Shimshon Tel Aviv F.C. players
Israeli football managers
Maccabi Netanya F.C. managers
Olympic footballers of Israel
Footballers at the 1976 Summer Olympics
Asian Games silver medalists for Israel
Asian Games medalists in football
Association football forwards
Footballers at the 1974 Asian Games
Medalists at the 1974 Asian Games
Israeli Football Hall of Fame inductees